Feilai Temple may refer to:

 Feilai Temple (Qingyuan), built during the Liang dynasty (502–587 CE) in Qingyuan, Guangdong, China.
 Feilai Temple (Deqin County), built during the Ming dynasty (1368–1662 CE) in Deqin County, Yunnan, China.

Buddhist temple disambiguation pages